Shropshire Languages Society (sometimes also known as Shropshire Languages or SLS)  was an independent college for language education. The organisation is mainly based in Shrewsbury and has registered charity status in England and Wales. The organisation mostly deals with adult learners but also occasionally some younger learners.

Background 
The Society, which dates back to around the early 1960s, was founded to provide accessible and inclusive language learning and advice on language learning for the less fortunate and people in the community. The Society caters for all people over the age of four and is often classified a provider of Further Education. Specialist provision in English to Speakers of Other Languages (ESOL) and Sensory Communication languages or methods such as British Sign Language or Lip Reading for a variety of age groups predominantly from less fortunate backgrounds is delivered by a specialist teaching team.

The Society led awareness raising for post compulsory language study from 2009-2014 in conjunction with Routes into Languages. Students aged 14 or over were encouraged to take a language post the age of 14 and, from 2011, have their studies at GCSE supplemented by a bridging course from GCSE to AS level. 
The society has an outreach service and also provides valuable resources which has no statutory funding for the local academic community. The Society is also the Shropshire area network of the Association for Language Learning and in 2014 became the lead for the Primary Languages Hub in Shropshire due to the new requirement for language study at Key Stage 2. In 2017 the charity opened a subsidiary called Friends of Shropshire Languages, a social association which convenes to provide language and cultural related events for the benefit of learners and speakers of other languages.

Language education in the United Kingdom